Stefano Durazzo (Genoa, 1668 - Genoa, 24 January 1744) was the 152nd Doge of the Republic of Genoa and king of Corsica.

Biography 
Son of Pietro Durazzo, doge of Genoa in the two years 1685 - 1687, and Violante Garbarino, he was born in the Genoese capital in 1668. Compared to other noble representatives, Stefano Durazzo, in fact, did not deal much with public life and even his biennial Dogate was somewhat uninfluential or almost "ordinary administration".  On February 3, 1736, his Dogate ended, but he continued to serve the Republic as head of the Magistrate of the War, and state inquisitor. Durazzo died in Genoa on January 24, 1744.

See also 

 Republic of Genoa
 Doge of Genoa
 Durazzo family

References 

18th-century Doges of Genoa
1668 births
1744 deaths